The Anti-Phishing Working Group (APWG) is an international consortium that attempts to eliminate fraud and identity theft caused by phishing and related incidents It brings together businesses affected by phishing attacks: security products and service companies, law enforcement agencies, government agencies, trade associations, regional international treaty organizations, and communications companies.

Founded in 2003 by David Jevans, the APWG has more than 3200 members from more than 1700 companies and agencies worldwide. Members include leading security companies such as Kaspersky Lab, BitDefender, Symantec, McAfee, VeriSign, IronKey, and Internet Identity. Financial industry members include the ING Group, VISA, MasterCard, and the American Bankers Association.

See also
Scareware
PhishTank

References

External links
APWG official website

Spamming
Technology consortia